In molecular biology, the YEATS domain is a protein domain found in a variety of proteins from eukaryotic organisms. YEATS domain proteins are found in a variety of chromatin modification molecular complexes. Structurally the domain has an immunoglobulin like fold. The YEATS domain has shown to bind to acetyllysine protein modifications. In addition to lysine acetylation, the YEATS domain has shown to be a reader domain for various lysine acylations, with highest affinity for lysine crotonylation.

See also

Bromodomain

References

Protein domains